Arenaria leptoclados, the lesser thyme-leaved sandwort, is a species of flowering plant in the family Caryophyllaceae.

It is found in Western Australia, Victoria, New South Wales and South Australia where it has become naturalised.

References

leptoclados
Plants described in 1845